Lamellasia is a genus of spiders in the family Linyphiidae. It was first described in 2014 by Tanasevitch. , it contains only one species, Lamellasia mirabilis, found in Thailand.

References

Linyphiidae
Monotypic Araneomorphae genera
Spiders of Asia